William Gilbert Rees (6 April 1827 — 31 October 1898) was an explorer, surveyor, and early settler in Central Otago, New Zealand. He and fellow explorer Nicholas von Tunzelmann were the first Europeans to settle the Wakatipu basin. Rees is regarded as the founder of Queenstown.

Biography

Rees was born in Haroldston St. Issell's, Pembrokeshire, Wales in 1827. His father was a commander with the Royal Navy. Rees was educated at the Royal Naval School.

Rees emigrated to New South Wales in 1852, where he became a sheep farmer. He returned to England in 1858 to marry his childhood sweetheart, his cousin Frances Rebecca Gilbert (born November 1838).

He established a high country farm in 1860 close to the current location of Queenstown's town centre. His homestead was located near the mouth of the Kawarau River, at the site of the present day Hilton Hotel. Some historic buildings have been preserved.

The Queenstown suburb of Frankton was named after his wife Frances. Cecil Peak and Walter Peak were named after the first given names of his son.

Gold was discovered not far to the northeast two years later, at which point Rees converted his wool shed into a hotel named the Queen's Arms, now known as Eichardt's.  Today, Rees is considered the founding father of Queenstown.

Rees was an early New Zealand exponent of the sport of cricket, having been born into a family with prominent links to the sport. He was a member of the Grace family, and related as a cousin to W. G. Grace, an early star of the game. He appeared in one first-class match for New South Wales in 1857; his cousin William Lee Rees played for Victoria in the same match.

Rees was a devout Anglican and helped with the building of St Peter's Church in central Queenstown, which was completed in 1863. The Rees River in Central Otago is named after Rees, and his statue stands on Rees Street, Queenstown, near the town pier. There is a hotel called "The Rees" on Frankton Road in Queenstown which bears his name and a bridge on  named in his honour.

He died in Blenheim, New Zealand, on 31 October 1898, and was buried at Omaka Cemetery.

Gallery

See also
 List of New South Wales representative cricketers

References

People from Queenstown, New Zealand
1827 births
1898 deaths
Settlers of Otago
New South Wales cricketers
Welsh emigrants to Australia
Welsh emigrants to New Zealand
Welsh cricketers
People of the Otago Gold Rush
Burials at Omaka Cemetery
Grace family